The 1956–57 season was Blackpool F.C.'s 49th season (46th consecutive) in the Football League. They competed in the 22-team Division One, then the top tier of English football, finishing fourth.

Jackie Mudie was the club's top scorer for the second consecutive season, with 38 goals (32 in the league and six in the FA Cup, including four against Fulham in the fourth round).

Table

Notes

References

Blackpool F.C.
Blackpool F.C. seasons